Michigan and Smiley are a Jamaican reggae/dancehall duo consisting of Papa Michigan (born Anthony Fairclough) and General Smiley (born Erroll Bennett). They rose to popularity during the first wave of dancehall music in the late 1970s.

Career
The duo of Michigan (Anthony Fairclough) and Smiley recorded at Clement "Coxsone" Dodd's Studio One in Jamaica, pressing their first number one hit single, "Rub a Dub Style", which featured their call and response style vocals, overdubbed on the Studio One riddim, "Vanity" (the instrumental alias given to Alton Ellis' Rocksteady classic, "I'm Just A Guy").  Their next single, perhaps a larger hit, "Nice Up the Dance" was a version of the quintessential Studio 1 rhythm, "Real Rock".  These singles, with four other tracks, also versions of Studio One rhythms, were released as their first album, Nice Up the Dance. The names of these two singles were quickly incorporated into the lexicon of dancehall phraseology. Their call and response style was likewise influential on the future developments of the music, blending together straightforward singing styles and toasting.  By 1982, they caught the attention of Henry "Junjo" Lawes, who recorded their biggest hit, "Diseases" over the "Mad Mad" riddim. This track was featured on their second LP, Downpression. They went on to cut an album for Channel One Records, Step by Step. The last of their hit records was "Sugar Daddy", pressed on RAS Records, which featured yet another reworking of "Mad Mad".

Michigan & Smiley recorded a version of Suzanne Vega's hit single "Tom's Diner" that is included on the compilation album Tom's Album.  The duo continue to record and make appearances at festivals and have both released solo recordings. Michigan is set to release the album DJ Legend, to be preceded in September 2014 by an EP of the same name.

Discography

Albums
Rub a Dub Style (1980) Studio One
Downpression (1982) Greensleeves
Live at Reggae Sunsplash (1982) Trojan (with Eek-a-Mouse)
Sugar Daddy (1983) RAS
Back in the Biz (1991) VP 
Reality Must Rule Again (1992) VP
Uptown/Downtown (1995) VP

References

External links
 http://www.papamichigan.com
 
 General Smiley & Papa Michigan - Nice Up The Dance (Ba Ba Boom Riddim) 
 Michigan & Smiley- Stress- Pepperseed Riddim
Steffens, Roger "[ Michigan & Smiley Biography]", Allmusic, Macrovision Corporation

Dancehall groups
Reggae duos
VP Records artists